The Santa Ana Walnut Growers were minor league baseball team based in Santa Ana, California in 1910. The Walnut Growers were succeeded by the short–lived 1929 Santa Ana Orange Countians. Santa Ana teams played as members of the Class D level Southern California Trolley League in 1910 and California State League in 1929, hosting home minor league games at Hawley Park.

History
Minor league baseball was first hosted in Santa Ana, California in 1910. The Santa Ana Walnut Growers became founding members of the Class D level Southern California Trolley League. The team was also referred to as the "Sand Dabs." Redondo Beach was one of six charter franchises when the league formed for the 1910 season under league president Jim McCormick. The Redondo Beach Wharf Rats joined the franchises from Long Beach, California (Long Beach Clothiers), Los Angeles, California (Los Angeles McCormicks and Los Angeles Maiers), Pasadena, California (Pasadena Silk Sox) and Redondo Beach, California (Redondo Beach Wharf Rats) to form the league. The "Trolley" name was in reference to all the league franchises, Redondo Beach included, being located in the greater Los Angeles, California area, where the league ballparks were accessible via trolley. Some references refer to the Santa Ana team as the "Yellow Sox."

When Santa Ana and the Southern California Trolley League began play in 1910, games were scheduled only on Sundays, with play to continue all year. The Walnut Growers officially began play on April 3, 1910 under their manager, referenced as Meats.

As the season progressed, both the Santa Ana Walnut Growers and Redondo Beach were the top league teams. After three weeks of play, both teams had 3–0 records, after seven weeks they were both 6–1 and after ten weeks they were tied with 8–2 records. In week eleven, the two teams met and Redondo Beach ended the tie in the standings, defeating Santa Ana by the score of 8–2. This was the final week of league play.

The Southern California Trolley League had franchises that faced immediate financial difficulty when play began. On May 3, 1910, the Pasadena Silk Sox and the Los Angeles Maiers franchises folded simultaneously, reducing the league to four remaining teams. On June 13, 1910, the entire Southern California Trolley League permanently disbanded. At the time the league folded, the Redondo Beach Warf Rats (9–2) were in 1st place in the California Trolley League Standings, followed by the Santa Ana Walnut Growers (8–3). The Long Beach Clothiers (4–5) and Los Angeles McCormicks (2–7) followed in the final Standings. After the league folded, it was reported that league president Jim McCormick organized a league meeting at his pool hall on South Spring Street for the purpose of settling the league's affairs.

Minor league baseball returned briefly to Santa Ana in 1929. The Santa Ana Orange Countiers began the season as members of the four–team Class D level California State League. On May 8, 1929, the Santa Ana franchise had a 4–20 record when the team moved to become the short–lived Pomona Arabs. Pomona (2–4) moved to Coronado County on May 15, 1929, playing as the Coronado Arabs. The league itself folded on June 17, 1929. At the time the league folded, the combined team finished last, placing 4th with a 22–38 overall record. Managed by Jess Orndorff and Pinch Thomas the Santa Ana/Pomona/Coronado team finished 12.5 games behind the 1st place San Diego Aces in the final standings.

Santa Ana has not hosted another minor league team.

The ballpark
The Santa Ana teams played home minor league games at Hawley Park.

Timeline

Year–by–year records

Notable alumni
Jess Orndorff (1929, MGR)
Pinch Thomas (1929, MGR)
The complete player roster for the 1910 Santa Ana team is unknown.

References

External links
Baseball Reference

Defunct baseball teams in California
Southern California Trolley League teams
Baseball teams established in 1910
Baseball teams disestablished in 1910
Santa Ana, California
Baseball teams in Los Angeles